Berkelium (97Bk) is an artificial element, and thus a standard atomic weight cannot be given. Like all artificial elements, it has no stable isotopes. The first isotope to be synthesized was 243Bk in 1949. There are 19 known radioisotopes, from 233Bk to 253Bk (with the exception of 235Bk and 237Bk), and 6 nuclear isomers. The longest-lived isotope is 247Bk with a half-life of 1,380 years.

List of isotopes 

|-
| 233Bk
| style="text-align:right" | 97
| style="text-align:right" | 136
| 
| 21 s
| α
| 229Am
|
|-
| rowspan=2|234Bk
| rowspan=2 style="text-align:right" | 97
| rowspan=2 style="text-align:right" | 137
| rowspan=2|
| rowspan=2|19(+6−4) s
| α (50%)
| 230Am
| rowspan=2|
|-
| β+ (50%)
| 234Cm
|-
| rowspan=2|236Bk
| rowspan=2 style="text-align:right" | 97
| rowspan=2 style="text-align:right" | 139
| rowspan=2|236.05733(43)#
| rowspan=2|22(+13−6) s
| α
| 232Am
| rowspan=2|
|-
| β+
| 236Cm

|-
| rowspan=3|238Bk
| rowspan=3 style="text-align:right" | 97
| rowspan=3 style="text-align:right" | 141
| rowspan=3|238.05828(31)#
| rowspan=3|2.40(8) min
| α
| 234Am
| rowspan=3|
|-
| β+, SF (.048%)
| (various)
|-
| β+ (rare)
| 238Cm
|-
| rowspan=3|239Bk
| rowspan=3 style="text-align:right" | 97
| rowspan=3 style="text-align:right" | 142
| rowspan=3|239.05828(25)#
| rowspan=3|100# s
| β+ (>99%)
| 239Cm
| rowspan=3|(7/2+)
|-
| α (<1%)
| 235Am
|-
| SF (<1%)
| (various)
|-
| rowspan=3|240Bk
| rowspan=3 style="text-align:right" | 97
| rowspan=3 style="text-align:right" | 143
| rowspan=3|240.05976(16)#
| rowspan=3|4.8(8) min
| β+ (90%)
| 240Cm
| rowspan=3|
|-
| α (10%)
| 236Am
|-
| β+, SF (.002%)
| (various)
|-
| rowspan=2|241Bk
| rowspan=2 style="text-align:right" | 97
| rowspan=2 style="text-align:right" | 144
| rowspan=2|241.06023(22)#
| rowspan=2|4.6(4) min
| α
| 237Am
| rowspan=2|(7/2+)
|-
| β+ (rare)
| 241Cm
|-
| rowspan=2|242Bk
| rowspan=2 style="text-align:right" | 97
| rowspan=2 style="text-align:right" | 145
| rowspan=2|242.06198(22)#
| rowspan=2|7.0(13) min
| β+ (99.99%)
| 242Cm
| rowspan=2|2−#
|-
| β+, SF (3×10−4%)
| (various)
|-
| style="text-indent:1em" | 242mBk
| colspan="3" style="text-indent:2em" | 200(200)# keV
| 600(100) ns
| SF
| (various)
|
|-
| rowspan=2|243Bk
| rowspan=2 style="text-align:right" | 97
| rowspan=2 style="text-align:right" | 146
| rowspan=2|243.063008(5)
| rowspan=2|4.5(2) h
| β+ (99.85%)
| 243Cm
| rowspan=2|(3/2−)
|-
| α (.15%)
| 239Am
|-
| rowspan=2|244Bk
| rowspan=2 style="text-align:right" | 97
| rowspan=2 style="text-align:right" | 147
| rowspan=2|244.065181(16)
| rowspan=2|4.35(15) h
| β+ (99.99%)
| 244Cm
| rowspan=2|(4−)#
|-
| α (.006%)
| 240Am
|-
| rowspan=2|245Bk
| rowspan=2 style="text-align:right" | 97
| rowspan=2 style="text-align:right" | 148
| rowspan=2|245.0663616(25)
| rowspan=2|4.94(3) d
| EC (99.88%)
| 245Cm
| rowspan=2|3/2−
|-
| α (.12%)
| 241Am
|-
| rowspan=2|246Bk
| rowspan=2 style="text-align:right" | 97
| rowspan=2 style="text-align:right" | 149
| rowspan=2|246.06867(6)
| rowspan=2|1.80(2) d
| EC (99.8%)
| 246Cm
| rowspan=2|2(−)
|-
| α (.2%)
| 242Am
|-
| rowspan=2|247Bk
| rowspan=2 style="text-align:right" | 97
| rowspan=2 style="text-align:right" | 150
| rowspan=2|247.070307(6)
| rowspan=2|1.38(25)×103 y
| α
| 243Am
| rowspan=2|(3/2−)
|-
| SF (rare)
| (various)
|-
| 248Bk
| style="text-align:right" | 97
| style="text-align:right" | 151
| 248.07309(8)#
| >300 y
| α
| 244Am
| 6+#
|-
| style="text-indent:1em" | 248mBk
| colspan="3" style="text-indent:2em" | 30(70)# keV
| 23.7(2) h
| β−
| 248Cf
| 1(−)
|-
| rowspan=3|249Bk
| rowspan=3 style="text-align:right" | 97
| rowspan=3 style="text-align:right" | 152
| rowspan=3|249.0749867(28)
| rowspan=3|330(4) d
| β−
| 249Cf
| rowspan=3|7/2+
|-
| α (.00145%)
| 245Am
|-
| SF (4.7×10−8%)
| (various)
|-
| style="text-indent:1em" | 249mBk
| colspan="3" style="text-indent:2em" | 8.80(10) keV
| 300 μs
| IT
| 249Bk
| (3/2−)
|-
| 250Bk
| style="text-align:right" | 97
| style="text-align:right" | 153
| 250.078317(4)
| 3.212(5) h
| β−
| 250Cf
| 2−
|-
| style="text-indent:1em" | 250m1Bk
| colspan="3" style="text-indent:2em" | 35.59(5) keV
| 29(1) μs
| IT
| 250Bk
| (4+)
|-
| style="text-indent:1em" | 250m2Bk
| colspan="3" style="text-indent:2em" | 84.1(21) keV
| 213(8) μs
|
|
| (7+)
|-
| rowspan=2|251Bk
| rowspan=2 style="text-align:right" | 97
| rowspan=2 style="text-align:right" | 154
| rowspan=2|251.080760(12)
| rowspan=2|55.6(11) min
| β−
| 251Cf
| rowspan=2|(3/2−)#
|-
| α (10−5%)
| 247Am
|-
| style="text-indent:1em" | 251mBk
| colspan="3" style="text-indent:2em" | 35.5(13) keV
| 58(4) μs
| IT
| 251Bk
| (7/2+)#
|-
| rowspan=2|252Bk
| rowspan=2 style="text-align:right" | 97
| rowspan=2 style="text-align:right" | 155
| rowspan=2|252.08431(22)#
| rowspan=2|1.8(5) min
| β−
| 252Cf
| rowspan=2|
|-
| α
| 248Am
|-
| 253Bk
| style="text-align:right" | 97
| style="text-align:right" | 156
| 253.08688(39)#
| 10# min
| β−
| 253Cf
|

Actinides vs fission products

See also

References 

 Isotope masses from:

 Isotopic compositions and standard atomic masses from:

 Half-life, spin, and isomer data selected from the following sources.

 
Berkelium
Berkelium